Abu Abolaji Azeez (born 31 May 1994) is a Nigerian beach soccer player. He plays as a forward for Nigerian Professional Football League club side Warri Wolves F.C. and for the Nigeria national beach soccer team.

Early life 
Abu Azeez grew up in Ojo part of Lagos in Nigeria with parents who made education a priority for him. He had a strong love for football but could only watch his friends join and represent school teams as his father didn't approve of him joining them.

Unfortunately, he had to wait till his dad died in 2005 before he could join a team. He got his first pair of boot with his father's gratuity.

Club career 
Abu joined amateur football team, Owibeseb FC in 2006 and spent three years with them before joining Bridge F.C. in 2009.

He turned professional in 2013 when he signed for Nigerian Professional Football League side, Kwara United F.C. He spent a year with the Ilorin-based club before he was signed by Warri Wolves F.C.

In 2016, he made the switch to Enyimba FC of Aba but once again he moved to Shooting stars sports club of ibadan the following year after a trial with Turkish club Samsunspor.

After one year back in the western part of Nigeria, Azeez moved back to the east, signing for the Enugu Rangers. He played one season with the Flying Antelopes before he joined Remo Stars F.C.

With Remo Stars dropping to the Nigeria National League in 2019, Azeez returned to Warri Wolves for a second stint and has been an important member of the team this season.

International career 
Abu Azeez made his debut for Nigeria at the 2009 FIFA Beach Soccer World Cup in Dubai where he scored twice as Nigeria crashed out in the group stages.

He became a vital member of the team from after that tournament and won his first trophy with the team in 2011 at the Copa Lagos.

In 2016, while he was still with Enyimba, Azeez announced that he was retiring from international beach football so he could focus regular football.

He, however, returned to the team later that year to help the West African to a second-place finish at the 2016 Africa Beach Soccer Cup of Nations which was hosted in Nigeria.

Azeez named Nigeria's captain in 2019, a year after he became the first and only Nigeria Beach soccer player to reach a century of goals.

Player profile 
A versatile forward player, Azeez is capable of playing on either wing or through the middle as a centre forward. He is very powerful, with skill and pace to support. while ostensibly right-footed, he is able to hit the ball well with his left foot. He is one of the most popular stars of the Nigeria professional football league.

Honours and achievements
Nigeria
FIFA Beach Soccer World Cup
Quarterfinals: 2011
BSWW Tour - Copa Lagos
Winners: 2011, 2012, 2013
Runners-up: 2019
 Africa Beach Soccer Cup of Nations
Runners-up: 2011, 2016, 2018
Third-place: 2015
Fourth-place: 2013

Warri Wolves

2015 Nigeria Professional Football League: 2nd Place

Individual

 MTN Lagos Street Soccer
MVP: 2010
 Beach Soccer Worldwide
Ambassador: Since 2017
Top 50 best Beach Soccer Worldwide players 2017
BSWW Tour - Copa Lagos
MVP: 2011, 2012, 2017
 Africa Beach Soccer Cup of Nations
Top scorer: 2013
 African Beach Games
Top scorer: 2019

References

1994 births
Living people
Nigerian beach soccer players